Ebonyi State University, Abakaliki was founded in 1999 in Abakaliki, Nigeria. The university's medical faculty was established in 1991 as ESUT's Faculty of Health Sciences. Many of its facilities were developed in response to a Guinea worm pandemic; the Abakaliki Specialist Hospital, created for this purpose, was remodelled to become Ebonyi State University's primary teaching hospital. It was subsequently granted accreditation by the Medical and Dental Council of Nigeria (MDCN) for the training of medical students and resident doctors. Since it became part of Ebonyi State University, the medical school has received considerable funding from the Ebonyi government.

Faculties
Agriculture & Natural Resource Management
Arts
Basic Medical Sciences 
Sciences
Clinical Medicine
Education
Health Science & Technology
Law
Management Sciences
Physical Sciences
Social Sciences
Engineering  and Environmental Science
School of Post Graduate studies

References

External links
 
 https://ebsustudent.com.ng/

1999 establishments in Nigeria
Educational institutions established in 1999
Ebonyi State University
Public universities in Nigeria